Guido de' Medici (died 1537) was a Roman Catholic prelate who served as Archbishop of Chieti (1528–1537) and Bishop of Venosa (1527–1528).

Biography
On 12 June 1527, Guido de' Medici was appointed during the papacy of Pope Clement VII as Bishop of Venosa.
On 3 January 1528, he was appointed during the papacy of Pope Clement VII as Archbishop of Chieti.
He served as Archbishop of Chieti until his death in 1537.

References

Bibliography

Pagliucci, Pio (1909). I Castellani del Castel S. Angelo. Vol. I, part 2: "I Castellani Vescovi,"  (Roma: Polizzi e Valentini 1909), pp. 79–96.
Salvini, Salvino (1782), Catalogo cronologico de' canonici della chiesa metropolitana fiorentina (Florence: Gaetano Cambiagi), p. 70, no. 480.

16th-century Italian Roman Catholic bishops
Bishops appointed by Pope Clement VII
1537 deaths